Fountain of Trevi (Italian:Fontana di Trevi) is a 1960 Italian-Spanish comedy film directed by Carlo Campogalliani and starring Claudio Villa, Rubén Rojo and Carlo Croccolo. It follows the life of two men working for a travel agency next to Rome's Fountain of Trevi.

Cast
 Claudio Villa as Claudio Marchetti  
 Rubén Rojo as Roberto Proietti  
 Carlo Croccolo as Wizard assistant  
 Maria Grazia Buccella as Franca / Manuela 
 Tiberio Murgia as Pertica  
 Mario Carotenuto as The Wizard  
 Marisa Mantovani 
 Pilar Vela as Dolores  
 Arnaldo Arnaldi as Giovanni Camilloni  
 Dori Dorika as La sora Nannina  
 Maria Letizia Gazzoni as Carmencita 
 Amelia de Castro 
 Rafael Durán
 Edda Ferronao 
 Marta Grau 
 Miguel Ligero 
 Rosario Maldonado as Rosita  
 Alfredo Mayo as Rafael Castillo  
 Gisia Paradis 
 Miguel Ángel Rodríguez
 Elisabetta Velinska
 Ciccio Barbi as Tax collector  
 Enzo Garinei as E.T.I.B. Manage

References

Bibliography 
 Parish, James Robert. Film Actors Guide. Scarecrow Press, 1977.

External links 
 

1960 films
Spanish comedy films
Italian comedy films
1960s Italian-language films
Films directed by Carlo Campogalliani
Films set in Rome
1960 comedy films
1960s Italian films
1960s Spanish films